Bani Hajer, also known as al-Hawajir, are an influential tribe in the Arabian Peninsula. The tribe is also called Bani Hajer (Family surnames: Al-Hajri) in eastern Saudi Arabia and other Arab states of the Persian Gulf (Qatar, UAE, Bahrain, Kuwait, Oman).

They are known for their business among trade with other tribes and families, as well as bringing foreign goods to Arabia.

Plural of Hajri, Al Hawajer are a Qahtanite Tribe from Abida, they resides near Sarat Abida also known as " alhirja" near Thahran Al Janoub, led by their shiekh Mohammed Bin Shaba'an in the early 13th Century as they migrated to Lower Najd. As once their shiekh became Shafi bin Safar bin Mohammed Bin Shaba'an they migrated once more towards the eastern village of Al Ahsa'a. Currently their shiekh is Nasser Bin Hamoud Bin Sahfi Bin Salim Bin Shafi Bin Safar Bin Mohammed Bin Shaba'an. some of them ventured into Qatar and resided there since, the majority of them are in Saudi Arabia across various regions such as South & Eastern regions, Mount Ladam from the north and al Saaa'dani from west.

They are considered Nomadic Bedouins and still maintain that purity of blood line, with time some of them moved to cities and settled amongst other civilizations, they held government offices and facilities specifically in their new home town " Ain Dar", Salasil, Yakrub, Fouda, Al Sharmiah, Al Asidiah, Al Fardaniah, Aboukola, Al Rafiah, Al Nasibiah and many more.

Kinzan Battle

Designated the Title of " Khaznat Thafar" The Vault of Victory by King Abdulaziz Al Saud for their Bravery in Al Ahsa'a Battle Against Al Ajman, in 1333 HD. King Abdulaziz headed to Kanzan in Al Ahsaa to stop the Atrocities of Al Ajman against civilians as they pillaged and hijacked anyone who crosses their path, as King abdulaziz called other tribes to his Aid few joined him, until Al Hajri Tribe led by Shafi bin Salim Al Sahfi Al Hajri and his tribesmen joined the battle, this is when the scale tipped as Al Hawajer are known for their knights and brutal strength, in this battle Al Ajman ambushed King Abdulaziz and nearly killed him with sword hit that slashed his abdomen, they however succeeded in killing King Abdulaziz brother Sa'ad Bin Abdulrahman.

After Victory in the battle they were summoned by king abdulaziz and asked them for whatever they desire, their Sheikh requested the land they reside on to be theirs ( from ain Dar all the way to the boarder of Qatar ) also known as "Jouf Bani Hajer"  and also that non of their tribesmen to be beheaded or have their hands amputated " in case one of them killed or stole". All Their requests were granted by King Abdulaziz  and also gave them the Title of " Khaznat Thafar" The Vault of Victory.

References
Oct 7, 2017 Video Interview by Prince Bandar bin Mohammed and a testimony of Al Hawajer in Kinzan Battle https://www.youtube.com/watch?v=mt7VZ71ILBY

Arab groups
Tribes of Saudi Arabia
Tribes of the United Arab Emirates
Tribes of Iraq
Tribes of Syria
Tribes of Arabia
Bedouin groups